Trutanich is a surname. Notable people with the surname include:

Carmen Trutanich (born 1951), American politician
Nicholas A. Trutanich, American attorney